Hope Harmel Smith (also created as Hope H. Smith) is an American television producer and writer. She has been working in daytime for over 20 years.

Positions held
All My Children
 Writer: October 2007 - July 2008
 Supervising Producer: January 4, 2010 to present (hired by Julie Hanan Carruthers)

The Bold and the Beautiful (hired by William J. Bell)
 Associate Producer: 1987 - 1988
 Producer: 1988 - 1996

General Hospital (hired by Wendy Riche)
 Producer: 1998 - 1999
 Consultant: 1997 - 1998

Guiding Light
 Production Coordinator: 1983 - 1985
 Producer: 1985 - 1987

Port Charles
 Producer: 1999 - 2003

Starting Over
 Writer/Producer: 2004

Sunset Beach
 Supervising Producer: 1996 - 1997

Awards and nominations
Daytime Emmy Award
Nomination, 2003, Drama Series, Port Charles
Win, 1999, Drama Series, General Hospital

External links

Soap opera producers
American television producers
American women television producers
Year of birth missing (living people)
American soap opera writers
Living people
American women television writers
Women soap opera writers
21st-century American women